

See also
 List of aircraft accidents and incidents resulting in at least 50 fatalities
 List of accidents and incidents involving airliners by location
 List of accidents and incidents involving commercial aircraft

External links
 Aircraft Crashes Record Office
 AirSafe
 Aviation Safety Network
 Federal Aviation Administration: Accident & Incident Data
 avherald.com an Aviation news source

Airliners by airline
Accidents and incidents